William Boughton is an English conductor.

William Boughton may also refer to:

William Boughton (cricketer) (1854–1936), English cricketer
William Boughton (MP) for Worcester
Sir William Boughton, 1st Baronet (1600–1656) of the Boughton baronets
Sir William Boughton, 3rd Baronet (1632–1683) of the Boughton baronets
Sir William Boughton, 4th Baronet (1663–1716) of the Boughton baronets
Sir William Edward Rouse Boughton 2nd and 10th Baronet (1788–1856) of the Boughton baronets
Sir William St Andrew Rouse Boughton, 4th and 12th Baronet (1853–1937) of the Boughton baronets

See also
William Rouse-Boughton (1788–1856), British politician
Boughton (disambiguation)